Einar August Vihma (until 1936 Wichmann; 19 September 1893, Kuopio – 5 August 1944, Ihantala) was a Finnish major general. During the Battle of Tali-Ihantala he commanded the 6th Division. He was killed in action during the battle.

Vihma started his military career in 1915 when he joined the Jäger Movement. In 1917 he came to Finland with the German U-boat  to fight on the side of the Whites during the Finnish Civil War. After the war he was head of the Finnish cadet school between 1933 and 1936 and head of the White Guard between 1936 and 1939.

During the Winter War he served as initially as a Brigade commander and later Division commander on the western Karelian Isthmus. He was awarded the Mannerheim Cross in 1941. During the Continuation War he took part in the re-capture of Vyborg and later in the Battle of Tali-Ihantala, where he distinguished himself by managing to halt the Soviet advance in his sector. He was killed in action during the long battle.

References

External links

1893 births
1944 deaths
People from Kuopio
People from Kuopio Province (Grand Duchy of Finland)
Finnish major generals
Jägers of the Jäger Movement
German military personnel of World War I
People of the Finnish Civil War (White side)
Finnish military personnel killed in World War II
Knights of the Mannerheim Cross